Liardetia tenuisculpta is a species of small air-breathing land snails, terrestrial pulmonate gastropod mollusks in the family Euconulidae, the hive snails. This species is endemic to Micronesia.

References

Fauna of Micronesia
Liardetia
Taxonomy articles created by Polbot